The Junkers EF 61 was a German prototype twin-engined high-altitude bomber aircraft of the 1930s.  Only two examples were built, but it provided valuable information on pressure cabins which aided the design of later pressurised aircraft.

Design and development
The pressurised cabin of the  Junkers EF 61 was based on that of the Junkers Ju 49. The EF 61 was one of the few German high-altitude bomber and reconnaissance projects before World War II. The project started in September 1935 and the maiden flight took place on 4 March 1937, but on 19 September of that year the EF 61 V1 was destroyed in a crash. The second prototype EF 61 V2 was ready in late 1937 but also crashed in December 1937, even before high-altitude testing had started. After that the project was abandoned.
The project eventually led to the high-altitude reconnaissance aircraft of the Junkers Ju 86 type in World War II.

Specifications

References

Book
  Hitler's Luftwaffe: A Pictorial History and Technical Encyclopedia of Hitler's Air Power in World War II (Hardcover)

External links

 Warbirds Resource Group data on the EF 61
 Aircraft Photo

EF 061
1930s German bomber aircraft
Aircraft first flown in 1937
Twin piston-engined tractor aircraft